Warne Marsh Lee Konitz: Jazz Exchange Vol. 3, is a live album by saxophonists Warne Marsh and Lee Konitz  which was recorded at the Jazzhus Montmartre in late 1975 and released on the Dutch Storyville label in 1985.

Reception 

The Allmusic review stated "Whenever tenor-saxophonist Warne Marsh and altoist Lee Konitz got together, fireworks resulted as the two complementary saxophonists always seemed to bring out the best in each other. ... Marsh and Konitz as usual get rid of the themes quickly and then engage in advanced chordal improvisation, showing what they learned from Lennie Tristano along with their growth since the late '40s".

Track listing 
 "Just Friends" (John Klenner, Sam M. Lewis) – 7:52
 "You Don't Know What Love Is" (Gene de Paul, Don Raye) – 3:56
 "Back Home" (Lennie Tristano) – 10:55
 "Little Willie Leaps" (Miles Davis) – 8:00
 "Old Folks" (Willard Robison, Dedette Lee Hill) – 4:16
 "Au Privave" (Charlie Parker) – 10:49
 "Chi-Chi" (Parker) – 7:14 Bonus track on CD reissue
 "Wow" (Tristano) – 6:30 Bonus track on CD reissue
Recorded at the Café Montmatre in Copenhagen, Denmark on December 3, 1975 (track 2), December 4, 1975 (track 3) and December 5, 1975 (tracks 1 & 4-8)

Personnel 
Warne Marsh – tenor saxophone
Lee Konitz – alto saxophone
Ole Kock Hansen – piano
Niels-Henning Ørsted Pedersen – bass
Svend-Erik Nørregaard (tracks 1 & 3-8), Alex Riel (track 2) – drums

References 

Warne Marsh live albums
Lee Konitz live albums
1985 live albums
Storyville Records live albums